Obando may refer to:

People
Ángel Obando, retired Honduran footballer
César Obando (1969-), retired Honduran footballer
José María Obando (1795-1861), Neogranadine General and politician who twice served as President of Colombia
Marvin Obando (1960-), retired Costa Rican footballer
Miguel Aguilar Obando (1953-), Salvadoran football coach
Miguel Obando y Bravo (1926-), Nicaraguan prelate of the Roman Catholic Church
Sherman Obando (1970-), former Major League Baseball player
Trotzky Augusto Yepez Obando, (1940-2010), Ecuadorian chess player

Other uses
Obando, Bulacan, a second class partially urban municipality in the province of Bulacan, Philippines
Obando Church, one of the oldest and most historic churches in the Philippines in the municipality above
Obando Fertility Rites, a Filipino dance ritual held at the church above
Obando, Valle del Cauca, a municipality located in the Department of Valle del Cauca, Colombia
Obando Airport, an airport in Puerto Inírida, Colombia
Puebla de Obando, a municipality located in the province of Badajoz, Extremadura, Spain